Canned music may refer to:

Elevator music
Orchestral pre-recorded music
Commercial recordings played during lip-synching in music
Karaoke
"Canned Music", a song by Dan Hicks (1973)
Canned Music, a record by Tall Dwarfs (1983)